Crambus tenuistriga is a moth in the family Crambidae. It was described by George Hampson in 1896. It is found in Lesotho and Gauteng, South Africa.

References

Crambini
Moths described in 1896
Moths of Africa